Gabon is a country in Central Africa, lying along the Atlantic Ocean, just south of the Bight of Biafra.

Borders
Gabon has a total of 3,261 km of international boundaries. It borders Equatorial Guinea (335 km) and Cameroon (349 km) to the north and the Republic of the Congo (2,567 km) to the east and south. Gabon lies on the equator.
 Maritime claims
 Territorial sea: 
 Contiguous zone: 
 Exclusive economic zone:

Terrain

Narrow coastal plain with patches of Central African mangroves; hilly interior; savanna in east and south. A recent global remote sensing analysis suggested that there were 420km² of tidal flats in Gabon, making it the 50th ranked country in terms of tidal flat area.
Irrigated land: 44.5 km2 (2003)
Total renewable water resources: 164 km3 (2011)

Environment
International agreements:

Party to: Biodiversity, Climate Change, Desertification, Endangered Species, Hazardous Wastes, Law of the Sea, Marine Dumping, Ozone Layer Protection, Ship Pollution, Tropical Timber 83, Tropical Timber 94, Wetlands, Whaling

Climate
The equatorial location of Gabon means that it has a tropical monsoon climate (Köppen Am) and a tropical savanna climate (Köppen Aw), with the temperature being hot year-round and humid, although the Benguela Current can moderate temperatures.

Extreme points 
Northernmost point - unnamed location on the border with Cameroon on the Ntem River, Woleu-Ntem province
Easternmost point - the unnamed location on the border with the Republic of Congo immediately south-west of the Congolese village of Mbeyi-Mbola, Haut-Ogooué province
Southernmost point - the point at which the border with the Republic of Congo enters the Atlantic Ocean, Nyanga Province
Westernmost point - the north-west point of Cape Lopez, Ogooué Maritime province

See also
Bam Bam Amphitheaters

References

External links